Mae Tha is a railway station located in Mae Tha Subdistrict, Mae Tha District, Lampang. It is located 628.445 km from Bangkok railway station and is a class 2 railway station. The station building is on the passing loop.

Train services
 Local 407/408 Nakhon Sawan-Chiang Mai-Nakhon Sawan

References 
 Ichirō, Kakizaki (2010). Ōkoku no tetsuro: tai tetsudō no rekishi. Kyōto: Kyōtodaigakugakujutsushuppankai. 
 Otohiro, Watanabe (2013). Tai kokutetsu yonsenkiro no tabi: shasō fūkei kanzen kiroku. Tōkyō: Bungeisha. 

Railway stations in Thailand